Mill Lane is a hamlet in Hampshire, England. Its nearest town is Fleet approximately 2.5 miles away. The hamlet lies on the A287 road between Odiham and Aldershot. The hamlet is only made up of a few houses and a petrol station.

Bowenhurst Golf Centre is located nearby with a 9-hole pay and play course and a floodlit Driving Range.

Villages in Hampshire